Dr. Alana Golmei is an Indian humanitarian, activist, lawyer. She is the founder of Pann Nu Foundation and founding member of Burma Center Delhi.

Golmei was awarded the Delhi Commission for Women's Achievement Award in 2016.

Early life
She was born in Tamenglong and is of Naga ethnicity from Manipur.

North East Support Center & Helpline
She started the North East Support Centre & Helpline in 2007 to assist and prevent harassment and abuses meted out to women, the North East people and tribal communities in Delhi and National Capital Region in India. She is also a member Bezbaruah Committee formed in 2014  to suggest measures to deal with racial discrimination targeted at Northeastern Indian.

References

External links
Let’s talk about racism | Don’t call us ‘chinky, momo, chowmein,’ says a Northeastern woman in Hindustan Times, 2017
Interaction with Dr. Alana Golmei, General Secy of NE Support Centre & Helpline, in Tejasvini, DD News.
Northeast Helpline numbers, by grin news

Indian women
Living people
Year of birth missing (living people)
Indian civil rights activists
Women from Manipur
People from Tamenglong district
Naga people
Activists from Nagaland